Highway 689 is a highway in the Canadian province of Saskatchewan. It runs from Highway 29 to Highway 40 near Prongu.

See also 
Roads in Saskatchewan
Transportation in Saskatchewan

References 

689